Seorsus is a genus of flowering plants in the family Myrtaceae. 
The occurrence of the four species in  Australia and Borneo is widely spaced, and is thought to be indicative that  the genus predates the breakup of Gondwana.

Species include:
Seorsus aequatorius Rye & Trudgen - endemic to West Kalimantan in Borneo.
Seorsus clavifolius (C.A.Gardner) Rye & Trudgen (syn. Astartea clavifolia) - endemic to the south-west of Western Australia
Seorsus intratropicus (F.Muell.) Rye & Trudgen (syn. Baeckea intratropica) - endemic to the Northern Territory.
Seorsus taxifolius (Merr.) Rye & Trudgen (syn. Baeckea taxifolius, Babingtonia taxifolia) - endemic to Sarawak in Borneo.

References

Myrtaceae
Myrtaceae genera
Taxa named by Barbara Lynette Rye
Taxa named by Malcolm Eric Trudgen